Wuthering High School is a 2015 American made-for-television drama film directed by Anthony DiBlasi and starring Francesca Eastwood, Paloma Kwiatkowski and James Caan.

It is a modern retelling of Emily Brontë's 1847 novel, Wuthering Heights.

Plot

Cathy and Heath were friends, as children, and engage in a wild and destructive relationship, as teenagers.

Cast
Paloma Kwiatkowski as Cathy Earnshaw
Andrew Jacobs as Heath
Matthew Boehm as Eddie Linton
James Caan as Mr. Earnshaw
Francesca Eastwood as Ellen

Reception
Emily Ashby of Common Sense Media gave the film two stars out of five.  Caitlin Gallagher of Bustle magazine notes "The sunniness of California doesn't match the original novel's moodiness (and broodiness) of the moors in northern England..."'' but observes that the main characters remain unlikeable, as in the novel.

References

External links
 
 

2010s English-language films
2015 television films
2015 films
2015 drama films
Lifetime (TV network) films
The Asylum films
Films based on Wuthering Heights
2010s American films